An application server is a server that hosts applications or software that delivers a business application through a communication protocol.

An application server framework is a service layer model. It includes software components available to a software developer through an application programming interface. An application server may have features such as clustering, fail-over, and load-balancing. The goal is for developers to focus on the business logic.

Java application servers
Jakarta EE (formerly Java EE or J2EE) defines the core set of API and features of Java application servers.

The Jakarta EE infrastructure is partitioned into logical containers.
EJB container: Enterprise Beans are used to manage transactions. According to the Java BluePrints, the business logic of an application resides in Enterprise Beans—a modular server component providing many features, including declarative transaction management, and improving application scalability.
 Web container: the web modules include Jakarta Servlets and Jakarta Server Pages (JSP).
 JCA container (Jakarta Connectors)
 JMS provider (Jakarta Messaging)

Commercial Java application servers have been dominated by WebLogic Application Server by Oracle, WebSphere Application Server from IBM and the open source JBoss Enterprise Application Platform (JBoss EAP) by Red Hat.

Microsoft
Microsoft's .NET positions their middle-tier applications and services infrastructure in the Windows Server operating system and the .NET Framework technologies in the role of an application server. The Windows Application Server role includes Internet Information Services (IIS) to provide web server support, the .NET Framework to provide application support, ASP.NET to provide server side scripting, COM+ for application component communication, Message Queuing for multithreaded processing, and the Windows Communication Foundation (WCF) for application communication.

PHP application servers
PHP application servers run and manage PHP applications.

 Zend Server, built by Zend, provides application server functionality for the PHP-based applications.
 appserver.io, built by TechDivision GmbH is a multithreaded application server for PHP written in PHP.
 RoadRunner, built by Spiral Scout is a high-performance PHP application server, load-balancer, and process manager written in Go.

Third-party
Mono (a cross platform open-source implementation of .NET supporting nearly all its features, with the exception of Windows OS-specific features), sponsored by Microsoft and released under the MIT License

Mobile application servers
Mobile application servers provide data delivery to mobile devices.

Mobile features
Core capabilities of mobile application services include
 Data routing– data is packaged in smaller (REST) objects with some business logic to minimize demands on bandwidth and battery
 Orchestration– transactions and data integration across multiple sources
 Authentication service– secure connectivity to back-end systems is managed by the mobile middleware
 Off-line support– allows users to access and use data even though the device is not connected
 Security– data encryption, device control, SSL, call logging

Mobile challenges
Although most standards-based infrastructure (including SOAs) are designed to connect to any independent of any vendor, product or technology, most enterprises have trouble connecting back-end systems to mobile applications, because mobile devices add the following technological challenges:
 Limited resources – mobile devices have limited power and bandwidth
 Intermittent connectivity – cellular service and wifi coverage is often not continuous
 Difficult to secure – mobility and BYOD practices make it hard to secure mobile devices

Deployment models
An application server can be deployed:
 On premises
 Cloud
 Private cloud
 Platform as a service (PaaS)

See also
Application service provider
List of application servers

References

Servers (computing)
Software architecture